The bill Senate Concurrent Resolution 10, "A concurrent resolution authorizing the use of Emancipation Hall in the Capitol Visitor Center for an event to celebrate the birthday of King Kamehameha", was introduced into the United States Senate in the 113th United States Congress on March 22, 2013.  It was sponsored by Senator Mazie Hirono (D-HI).  It was passed by the Senate on April 8, 2013 and referred to the United States House of Representatives.

Provisions/Elements of the bill
This summary is based largely on the exact test of the bill, a public domain source. 

SECTION 1. USE OF EMANCIPATION HALL FOR EVENT TO CELEBRATE BIRTHDAY OF KING KAMEHAMEHA.

(a) Authorization.--Emancipation Hall in the Capitol Visitor Center is authorized to be used for an event on June 9, 2013, to celebrate the birthday of King Kamehameha.

(b) Preparations.--Physical preparations for the conduct of the ceremony described in subsection (a) shall be carried out in accordance with such conditions as may be prescribed by the Architect of the Capitol.

End of legislation text.

Procedural history

Senate
S.Con.Res 10 was introduced into the Senate on March 22, 2013 by Senator Mazie Hirono (D-HI).  It was co-sponsored by Senator Brian Schatz (D-HI).  The bill was referred to the United States Senate Committee on Rules and Administration.  It was passed by the Senate on April 8, 2013 and referred to the United States House of Representatives.

House
S.Con.Res 10 was received by the House on April 9, 2013.  It was referred to the United States House Committee on House Administration.  The House Majority Leader Eric Cantor announced on Friday May 10, 2013 that H.R. 1580 would be considered the following week. It passed the house unanimously on May 14, 2013.

See also
List of bills in the 113th United States Congress

References

External links

Library of Congress THOMAS S.Con.Res 10 
beta.congress.gov S.Con.Res 10
GovTrack.us S.Con.Res 10
OpenCongress.org S.Con.Res 10

Proposed legislation of the 113th United States Congress
United States Senate resolutions